Sir John Stainton Whitehead  (20 September 1932 – 8 November 2013) was a British diplomat and businessman.

Career
Whitehead was educated at Christ's Hospital and Hertford College, Oxford and joined the British Foreign Service in 1955 after a period of National Service.

He was Ambassador from the United Kingdom to Japan from 1986 until 1992.

After his retirement from the diplomatic service, he was a senior advisor to Deutsche Bank, Tokyo Electric Power Company (TEPCO) and other international companies.

He became Chairman of Deutsche Morgan Grenfell Trust Bank (Japan).

Honours
 Order of St Michael and St George, Knight Commander (KCMG)
 Order of St Michael and St George, Knight Grand Cross (GCMG)
 Royal Victorian Order, Commander (CVO)
 Order of the Rising Sun, Grand Cordon, 2006
 Honorary Fellow of Hertford College, Oxford

References

External links
 "(Nearly) meeting the Emperor" at Daiwa Foundation

Alumni of Hertford College, Oxford
Ambassadors of the United Kingdom to Japan
Commanders of the Royal Victorian Order
Knights Grand Cross of the Order of St Michael and St George
People educated at Christ's Hospital
1932 births
2013 deaths
20th-century British diplomats